Colins Kelechi Osunwa (born 15 October 1984) is a Nigerian football striker.

Early life
Osunwa was born on 15 October 1984 in Rivers State, Nigeria.

Career
Osunwa has played professional football since 2001. He played for Dolphins in Nigeria before moving to Sudan to join Al-Hilal. The former Nigeria youth international helped Al-Hilal reach the semi-final of the 2007 CAF Champions League.

In 2009 Kelechi signed a three-year deal with Al-Merreikh, where he would win the Sudan Premier League in 2011 and 2013. Osunwa formed an all-Nigerian strike force with former Enyimba striker Stephen Worgu, who also joined Al-Merreikh in January 2009.

Osunwa signed a two-year contract with Thai Premier League side BEC Tero Sasana in January 2014. After six months in Thailand, Osunwa signed a two-year deal with Ismaily of the Egyptian Premier League.

kelechi signed 3 years with Alahly Shendi in soudan in late 2014. He is the highest alltime topscorer of Sudan premier league with 164 goals 54 with alhilal 66 with almerikh and  44 with alahly shendy .
before faissal alagab (121) with almerikh 111 merikh alfasher 8 alnil shendi 2.

keleshi scored 104 goals in 167 games with almerikh in official comps during his first era (4years).
he is the team top scorer in 2012 with 40 goals in 51 games (inc friendly)  
2013 with 26 in 41 (inc friendly) 
2009 with 32 inc friendly .

he assisted 8 with almerikh in 2013 :

3 in Sudan premiere league . 1 in Sudan cup .4 friendly games.

he has 30 goals in African club competitions 10 with dolfins 9 almerikh 9 with alhilal and 2 with alahly shendi.he is the top scorer of 2002 Africa cup under 17 with 5 goals.and the top scorer of Nigerian league second division in 2004.

International career 
Osunwa was member of the Nigeria's under-23 national team. He played for the senior Nigeria national football team at the 2004 LG Cup in Tripoli, Libya. He was named to the preliminary Sudan squad for the 2012 African Cup of Nations.

References

External links 

1984 births
Living people
Nigeria international footballers
Association football forwards
Expatriate footballers in Sudan
Dolphin F.C. (Nigeria) players
Nigerian expatriate sportspeople in Sudan
Expatriate footballers in Thailand
Al-Hilal Club (Omdurman) players
Al-Merrikh SC players
Ismaily SC players
Egyptian Premier League players
Nigerian footballers
Nigerian expatriate footballers
Al-Ahly Shendi players
Kelechi Osunwa
Expatriate footballers in Egypt
Sudan Premier League players